Harjeeta is a 2018 Indian Punjabi-language sports-drama film written by Jagdeep Sidhu and directed by Vijay Kumar Arora. Co-produced by Sizzlen Productions, Malika Productions, Omjee Group, and Villagers Film Studio; it stars Ammy Virk, Sawan Rupowali, Sameep Ranaut, and Pankaj Tripathi. The film chronicles the story of Harjeet Singh, a field hockey player raised from poor family and captained Indian team in Junior World Cup. The film was released on 18 May 2018. The film got positive reviews from critics but was a commercially unsuccessful. Harjeeta won two National Film Awards for Best Punjabi Film and Best Child Actor (Ranaut).

Plot

Raised in a poor, dysfunctional home, a young man Harjeet Singh (Ammy Virk) dreams of winning the World Cup in field hockey. The film starts out in a Kabaddi field, where Harjeet Singh, lovingly called Tully by his friends and family, is clearly the star player and captain of his Kabaddi team. His father, whom Harjeet affectionately calls Bapu, is happily cheering him on the sidelines. Harjeet's team effortlessly wins and he gets dishes as a reward. While walking back home, his father wonders to Harjeet what if he had received cash prize instead of dishes.

Cast
Ammy Virk as Harjeet Singh/Tuli
Sameep Ranaut as Young Harjeet Singh/Tuli
Pankaj Tripathi as Coach
Sawan Rupowali
Raj Jhinger as a Big Brother  of Harjeeta (Ammy Virk)
Gurpreet K Bhangu
Parkash Gadu
Sukhi Chahal
Jarnail Singh
Pukhraj Bhalla as Manpreet
Amberdeep Singh as special appearance as coach

Soundtrack 

Harjeeta’s soundtrack is composed by Gurmeet Singh while background score is composed by Raju Singh. It was released by record label Lokdhun Punjabi on 12 May 2018 at iTunes and other platforms. Song “Kinna Pyaar” sung by Mannat Noor was well received by audience, and as of August 2019 it has been viewed over 14 million times on YouTube.

Reception 

Jasmine Singh of The Tribune gave four stars out of five. Singh praised Arora's direction and Jagdeep Sidhu’s story, and described it as “fine balance of emotions, drama, romance and comedy“. She also praised performance by Sameep Ranaut, said, “It is Sameep who prepares the perfect ground for the young Tuli. Sameep delivers an award-winning performance and so does the young Tuli [Ammy Virk].” Singh praised performances by Virk, Gurpreet Bhangu, Parkash Gadhu, Pankaj Tripathi, Sawan Rupowali, and Raj Jhinjer. In last added, “Harjeeta is a fine example of a good story, good direction, good acting, good music, together in one team, heading for a goal...And goal it is for team Harjeeta!” Punjabi website Daah Films gave three and a half stars out of five.

Accolades

References

External links
 

2018 films
Punjabi-language Indian films
2010s Punjabi-language films
Indian biographical films
Best Punjabi Feature Film National Film Award winners
2010s biographical films